Chris St. Clair (born in or around 1960) is a Canadian weather presenter who, until his retirement, was the host of Saturday and Sunday morning and early afternoon broadcasts on The Weather Network. As he has said on the show, he grew up in [Halifax]. For The Weather Network, St. Clair also hosted WeatherWise, a segment where he explained different weather phenomena.  He is the station's longest-serving host, having joined the station in 1994. St. Clair retired from The Weather Network on Saturday, July 25, 2021, after 27 years.
He attended [[Acadia University])
, and is a former commercial airline pilot.  His books, ‘Weather Permitting, 25 Years Of I e Storms, Hurricanes,Wildfires & Extreme Climate Change In Canada’ was published by Simon & Schuster in 2022. Canada’s Weather: The Climate that Shapes a Nation was published in 2009.
St. Clair appeared on The Mercer Report on CBC Television, that first aired on January 25, 2011.

References

External links
The Weather Network biography
Canada's Weather: The Climate that Shapes a Nation

Acadia University alumni
Living people
Canadian television meteorologists
Canadian non-fiction writers
Commercial aviators
Year of birth missing (living people)